Vittorio Lucchetti (December 21, 1894 – February 3, 1965) was an Italian gymnast who competed at the 1920 Summer Olympics, the 1924 Summer Olympics and the 1928 Summer Olympics.

He was a member of the Italian team, which won the gold medal in the gymnastics men's team, European system event, in 1920, as well as in the team competition in 1924. In 1920, Lucchetti also competed in the individual all-around competition and finished 18th.

References

1894 births
1965 deaths
Italian male artistic gymnasts
Gymnasts at the 1920 Summer Olympics
Gymnasts at the 1924 Summer Olympics
Gymnasts at the 1928 Summer Olympics
Olympic gymnasts of Italy
Olympic gold medalists for Italy
Olympic medalists in gymnastics
Medalists at the 1924 Summer Olympics
Medalists at the 1920 Summer Olympics